77–78 Pall Mall is a grade II listed building in Pall Mall, London. It is currently used as a business centre.

References

External links 
http://www.leo.co.uk/serviced-offices/all/78-79-pall-mall/

Grade II listed buildings in the City of Westminster
Houses completed in 1863
Grade II listed houses in London